The KH-8 (BYEMAN codename Gambit-3) was a long-lived series of reconnaissance satellites of the "Key Hole" (KH) series used by the United States from July 1966 to April 1984, and also known as Low Altitude Surveillance Platform. The satellite ejected "film-bucket" canisters of photographic film that were retrieved as they descended through the atmosphere by parachute. There were 54 launch attempts of the 3,000 kilogram satellites, all from Vandenberg Air Force Base, on variants of the Titan III rocket. Three launches failed to achieve orbit. The first one was satellite #5 on April 26, 1967, which fell into the Pacific Ocean after the Titan second stage developed low thrust. The second was satellite #35 on May 20, 1972, which suffered an Agena pneumatic regulator failure and reentered the atmosphere. A few months later, pieces of the satellite turned up in England and the US managed to arrange for their hasty return. The third failure was satellite #39 on June 26, 1973, which suffered a stuck Agena fuel valve. The Bell 8096 engine failed to start and the satellite burned up in the atmosphere. The KH-8 was manufactured by Lockheed. The camera system/satellite was manufactured by Eastman Kodak's A&O Division in Rochester, New York.

The Gambit codename was also used by the satellite's predecessor, the KH-7 Gambit.

They carried  of film and were designed for longer missions of up to 31 days.

While Gambit was primarily designed and operated as a surveillance satellite, capturing high definition images of specific targets at low orbital altitudes, a single Gambit Block 3 mission was operated in 'dual-mode', orbiting first at a higher altitude to capture wide-area search imagery before lowering its perigee to capture normal surveillance imagery. The first film return capsule failed to separate correctly due to a new pyro mechanism failing to perform correctly. The contingency release mechanism separated the film bucket and parachute from its return capsule, and left the film bucket stranded in orbit. In September 2002, the film bucket re-entered over the South Atlantic into deep water. As the film bucket lacked its protective heatshield or the parachute needed to slow its descent, no attempt was made to recover it.

Camera Optics Module

The Camera Optics Module of KH-8 consists of four cameras.

In the strip camera the ground image is reflected by a steerable flat mirror to a  diameter stationary concave primary mirror. The primary mirror reflects the light through an opening in the flat mirror and through a Ross corrector. The Astro-Position Terrain Camera (APTC) contains three cameras: a 75mm focal length terrain frame camera, and two 90mm focal length stellar cameras. The terrain frame camera takes exposures of Earth in direction of the vehicle roll position for attitude determination. The stellar cameras observed in 180 degree opposite directions and took images of star fields.

The films used by GAMBIT were provided by Eastman Kodak, and evolved through a series of successively higher definition films, starting with Type 3404 with a resolving power of 50 to 100 line pairs per mm. Subsequent films used were Type 1414 high-definition film, SO-217 high-definition fine-grain film, and a series of films with silver-halide crystals of very uniform size and shape. The size of silver-halide crystals decreased from 1,550 angstrom in film Type SO-315, to 1,200 angstrom in SO-312, and ultimately to 900 angstrom in SO-409. Under optimal conditions GAMBIT would thus have been able to record ground features as small as  using the Eastman Kodak Type 3404 film. Using a film with a resolving power equivalent to the Kodak's Type 3409 film of 320 to 630 line pairs per mm, GAMBIT would have been able to record ground features as small as 5 cm to 10 cm (2" to 4"). The initial September 2011 release of "The Gambit Story" quotes "The mature system produced examples of imagery better than four inches ground-resolution distance". This number was again redacted in a later release. Five to ten centimeters corresponds to the resolution limit imposed by atmospheric turbulence as derived by Fried  and, independently, Evvard in the mid-1960s; remarkably, GAMBIT had reached a physical limit on resolution only a few years after the US launched its first reconnaissance satellite. GAMBIT was also able to record objects in orbit. The capability was developed to photograph Soviet spacecraft, but was first used to aid NASA engineers designing repairs for the damaged Skylab space station in 1973.

Missions

(NSSDC ID Numbers: See COSPAR)

Notable Missions
In May 1973 Gambit KH3-38 was used to observe the crippled Skylab space station, as part of the preparation for repairing it by the Skylab 2 mission.

Cost
The total cost of the 54 flight KH-8 program from FY1964 to FY1985, without non-recurring costs, was US$2.3 billion in respective year dollars.

Other U.S. imaging spy satellites
 Corona series: KH-1, KH-2, KH-3, KH-4
 KH-5 ARGON, KH-6 LANYARD 
 KH-7 Gambit and KH-8 GAMBIT
 KH-9 Hexagon "Big Bird"
 MOL – KH-10
 KH-11 Kennen, Misty (classified project), Enhanced Imaging System

References
 Mark Wade (August 9, 2003). KH-8. Encyclopedia Astronautica. Accessed April 23, 2004.
 KH-8 Gambit. GlobalSecurity.org

1973 in spaceflight
KH-08Gambit
Surveillance